Rathburn is a surname. Notable people with the surname include:
 Chelsea Rathburn, American poet
 Cliff Rathburn, American comic book artist
 Eldon Rathburn (1916–2008), Canadian film composer